Julia Shaw may refer to:

Julia Shaw (cyclist) (born 1965), British cyclist
Julia Shaw (psychologist) (born 1987), Canadian psychologist